The Pregnant Concert is a live recording of a recital by American rock band Rasputina held at the Knitting Factory in Williamsburg, Brooklyn on September 13, 2009 (although the album cover claims it to have been 1909). It contains songs from various previous Rasputina albums, covers of a variety of other musicians, and the songs "Holocaust of Giants" and "Kinderhook Hoopskirt Works" from their then upcoming album Sister Kinderhook.

As the album title implies, frontwoman Melora Creager was pregnant with her second daughter at the time of the recording. The band asserts that "If you listen very carefully, you might hear Ivy singing with Melora.".

The photographs are by Dese'Rae L. Stage.

Track listing

Encore

 "Rusty the Skatemaker" / "Bad Moon [Rising] (Creedence Clearwater Revival)" / "Remnants of Percy Bass" – 13:32

Personnel
Melora Creager – cello, vocals
Daniel DeJesus – 2nd chair cello
Julie Griner – drums

References

Rasputina (band) albums
2009 live albums